The Tomaquag Indian Memorial Museum is an Indigenous museum in Exeter, Rhode Island. The museum was founded by anthropologist Eva Butler and a Narragansett and Wampanoag woman named Princess Red Wing in the 1950s. 

It is one of the oldest tribal museums in the country and is located in Exeter, Rhode Island.  The museum won a National Medal for Museum and Library Service in 2016. The museum was nominated by U.S. Senator Sheldon Whitehouse. 

The museum showcases the history and culture of the natives peoples who have lived and currently reside in southeastern New England including the Narragansett, Niantic, Pokanoket, Wompanoag and Nipmuck. Exhibits include traditional crafts, such as ash splint baskets and locally made dolls, historical archives dating back to the 1880s, culture and important Indigenous figures including Princess Red Wing and Ellison "Tarzan" Brown Sr.  The museum's grounds include a wetu (traditional domed hut) and a traditional Three Sisters garden with corn, beans and squash. There is also a forest and an outdoor Friendship Circle.

The site of the museum was originally home to the Dovecrest Restaurant and Trading Post, founded by Eleanor and Ferris Dove. The Dove family donated their personal property soon thereafter to establish a permanent home for the museum.

In 2003, Lorén Spears founded the Nuweetooun School on the site of the museum. It was a private school for grades K-8. Open to any student, it focused on Indigenous youth. Nuweetooun School was closed in Spring of 2010 due to damage from flooding.  

The museum is open on Wednesdays and on weekends.

See also
List of museums in Rhode Island
The Narragansett Dawn

References

Further reading

External links
 Official site

Museums in Washington County, Rhode Island
Native American museums in Rhode Island
Narragansett tribe
Exeter, Rhode Island
History museums in Rhode Island